is a railway station on the Aoimori Railway Line in the town of Nanbu in Aomori Prefecture, Japan, operated by the third sector railway operator Aoimori Railway Company.

Lines
Sannohe Station is one of six principal stations served by the Aoimori Railway Line, and is 5.5 kilometers from the terminus of the line at Metoki Station. It is 622.8 kilometers from Tokyo Station.

Station layout
Sannohe Station has a one ground-level island platform and one ground-level side platform serving three tracks connected to the station building by a footbridge. However, only tracks 1 and 3 are in use, and track 2 is used as a siding. The station is staffed.

Platforms

Note: Track 2 is used primarily for freight trains changing direction.

History
When the Nippon Railway was nationalized on November 1, 1906, it became a station of the Tōhoku Main Line on the Japan National Railways (JNR), and the kanji for its name was changed to the present configuration. Freight operations were discontinued from April 1962. With the privatization of the JNR on April 1, 1987, it came under the operational control of JR East. It came under the control of the Aoimori Railway Line on December 1, 2002.

Surrounding area
Mabechi River
former Nanbu Town Hall
Sannohe Castle site

See also
 List of Railway Stations in Japan

References

External links
] 

Railway stations in Aomori Prefecture
Aoimori Railway Line
Railway stations in Japan opened in 1898
Nanbu, Aomori